Khunik-e Pay Godar (also Romanized as Khūnīk-e Pāy Godār and Khūnīk-e Pā Godār; also known as Khūnīk, Khānaq, Khūnīk Bālā and Khūnīk ‘Olyā) is a village in Qaen Rural District, in the Central District of Qaen County, South Khorasan Province, Iran. At the 2006 census, its population was 97, in 31 families.

References 

Populated places in Qaen County